Bernard George Neal (29 March 1922 – 26 March 2016) was a professor of structural engineering at Imperial College London and the winner of the All England croquet championship on 38 occasions.

Croquet
Bernard Neal won the Open Championship twice (1972 and 1973) and the Men's Championship in 1967.

Neal represented England and latterly Great Britain in three MacRobertson Shield tournaments, winning on two occasions.

As an administrator, Neal served on the Council of the Croquet Association from 1966 to 2009, serving as Chairman (1972 to 1974), Vice President (1996 to 2004) and President (2004 to 2009).

In 2010, Neal was inducted into the World Croquet Federation Hall of Fame.

Academic
He was elected to the fellowship of The Royal Academy of Engineering in 1980.

Selected publications
Structures and the applied scientist. University College of Swansea, Swansea, 1955.
The plastic methods of structural analysis. Chapman & Hall, 1956.
Structural theorems and their applications. Pergamon Press, Oxford, 1964. (Commonwealth and International Library)

References

External links
YouTube

1922 births
2016 deaths
Academics of Imperial College London
Academics of Swansea University
People educated at Merchant Taylors' School, Northwood
Alumni of the University of Cambridge
English croquet players
British structural engineers
English male tennis players
Deans of the City and Guilds College
British male tennis players